Mario Brandenburg (born 3 October 1983) is a German computer scientist and politician of the Free Democratic Party (FDP) who has been serving as a member of the Bundestag from the state of Rhineland-Palatinate since 2017.

In addition to his parliamentary work, Brandenburg has been serving as Parliamentary State Secretary to Federal Minister of Education and Research Bettina Stark-Watzinger since June 2022. In this capacity, he was also the Commissioner for Translational Research.

Early life and career 
Brandenburg studied business informatics at the University of Applied Sciences in Ludwigshafen and graduated with a master's degree (M.Sc.). Since then he has been employed at the software company SAP, where he first worked in software development, then in consulting and finally in international product sales.

Political career 
Brandenburg has been a member of the FDP since 2010. 

Brandenburg first became a member of the Bundestag in the 2017 German federal election. In parliament, he joined the Committee on Education, Research and Technology Assessment (2017–2022) and also the Committee on Digital Affairs (2017–2021). He served as his parliamentary group's spokesperson on technology policy.

In the negotiations to form a so-called traffic light coalition of the Social Democratic Party (SPD), the Green Party and the FDP following the 2021 German elections, Brandenburg was part of his party's delegation in the working group on digital innovation and infrastructure, co-chaired by Jens Zimmermann, Malte Spitz and Andreas Pinkwart.

Other activities 
 Fraunhofer Society, Ex-Officio Member of the Senate (since 2022)
 German Foundation for Peace Research (DSF), Ex-Officio Member of the Board (since 2022)
 Federal Agency for Disruptive Innovation (SPRIN-D), Member of the Supervisory Board (since 2022)

References

External links 

  

1983 births
Living people
Members of the Bundestag for Rhineland-Palatinate
Members of the Bundestag 2021–2025
Members of the Bundestag 2017–2021
Members of the Bundestag for the Free Democratic Party (Germany)